Javier Dussán (born 13 May 1980) is a Colombian footballer currently playing for Depor FC of the Primera Division B in Colombia. He plays as a goalkeeper.

He has been remembered in Chile for his spell at Deportes Melipilla.

Career
Dussán has played for several football clubs in Colombia, including Girardot FC, Real Cartagena, América de Cali, Depor FC and Academia FC. He helped Real Cartagena achieve promotion to Categoría Primera A in 1999.

In 2008, Dussán moved to Chile, joining Deportes Melipilla. He left Melipilla to join Panamanian side Tauro FC in January 2010.
In 2012 the returns to Depor FC, a professor at the soccer school in Cali (Colombia) Azteca Diablo.

References

External links
 Profile at BDFA 
 

1980 births
Living people
Colombian footballers
Girardot F.C. footballers
Real Cartagena footballers
América de Cali footballers
Atlético F.C. footballers
Academia F.C. players
Deportes Melipilla footballers
Tauro F.C. players
Categoría Primera A players
Categoría Primera B players
Chilean Primera División players
Primera B de Chile players
Colombian expatriate footballers
Colombian expatriate sportspeople in Chile
Colombian expatriate sportspeople in Panama
Expatriate footballers in Chile
Expatriate footballers in Panama
Association football goalkeepers
People from Tolima Department